Örebro HK is a Swedish ice hockey club located in Örebro. The team is currently playing in the Swedish Hockey League (SHL; formerly Elitserien), the top tier of Swedish ice hockey, since the 2013–14 season. The team's home arena is Behrn Arena, which seats 5,500 spectators.

History 
The club was formed in 1990 as HC Örebro 90. While Örebro IK (ÖIK) existed, HC Örebro 90's goal was to make sure that ice hockey players who didn't get a spot in Örebro IK could still play ice hockey in Örebro. Following ÖIK's bankruptcy in 1999, several ÖIK players moved to HC Örebro 90. The club changed its name to Örebro HK in 2005.

The team promoted to the second-tier league Allsvenskan (now HockeyAllsvenskan) in the 2000–01 season, but were relegated to Division 1 in the 2003–04 season. The team would spend five seasons in Division 1 after the relegation. The team reached the Kvalserien qualification for HockeyAllsvenskan in the 2008–09 season and successfully promoted back to HockeyAllsvenskan, ending first in the Kvalserien qualification. The team ended tenth in the 2009–10 HockeyAllsvenskan season and thus missed the playoffs.

In the 2010–11 season they improved significantly, finishing third in the standings and thus reaching the 2011 Kvalserien qualification for the top-tier league Elitserien/SHL. The team ended fifth in the qualification and thus failed to promote to Elitserien that year. Two years later, in the 2013 Kvalserien, the team finally managed to promote to the SHL. The team made their SHL debut in the 2013–14 season. It was their first SHL season in club history and the first SHL season with a team from Örebro since 1978–79.

Season-by-season record

Players and personnel

Current roster

Updated 18 February 2023

Team captains

 Henrik Löwdahl, 2008–16
 Viktor Ekbom, 2016–18
 Jere Sallinen, 2017–19
 Christopher Mastomäki, 2019–20
 Stefan Warg, 2020–21
 Rodrigo Ābols, 2021–

Honored members

Franchise records and leaders

Scoring leaders
These are the top-ten point-scorers of Örebro HK since their promotion to the SHL in the 2013–14 season. Figures are updated after each completed season.

Note: Pos = Position; GP = Games played; G = Goals; A = Assists; Pts = Points; P/G = Points per game;  = current Örebro HK player

Trophies and awards

Individual
Guldhjälmen
 Derek Ryan: 2014–15

Peter Forsberg Trophy
 Derek Ryan: 2014–15

References

External links 

Official home page

 
Ice hockey teams in Sweden
Sport in Örebro
1990 establishments in Sweden
Ice hockey clubs established in 1990
Ice hockey teams in Örebro County
Swedish Hockey League teams